New Vision was an electoral alliance of independent candidates formed to contest the 2011 Irish general election.

The formation of the group was announced at a meeting in Dublin organised by the economist David McWilliams on 31 January 2011. Eamonn Blaney, son of former Independent Fianna Fáil Teachta Dála and minister Neil Blaney, stated that he was launching "a movement called New Vision" and that the group would run candidates in the upcoming general election. He stated that New Vision already had the allegiance of "several strong Independents who will unite around four principles".

The group held a press launch on 9 February 2011 where they revealed the 19 candidates that had agreed to run under the New Vision label. Each candidate had committed to vote en bloc on four issues, but were free to campaign on other national and local issues as they wished. As well as Eamonn Blaney, prominent candidates were his brother MacDara, and Luke 'Ming' Flanagan.

The four core issues which each New Vision candidate agreed to support were described by the group as:
The separation of bank debt and sovereign debt
A viable strategy to create jobs
The overhaul of politics and the public service
A better deal for the country's natural resources.

The number of independent candidates in the New Vision alliance subsequently rose to 20.

A different political party called Fís Nua, which means "New Vision" in Irish, also ran candidates in the 2011 general election. Eamonn Blaney stated that he was "unaware of the existence" of Fís Nua when he registered the business and domain names for New Vision.

Results
The candidates in the New Vision alliance received the following votes at the 2011 general election. One candidate, Luke 'Ming' Flanagan was elected.

Political careers after New Vision
Luke Ming Flannagan the only successful candidate in the general election went on to be elected as an independent MEP, for North-West in 2014 and re-elected in 2019. Padraig O'Sullivan was elected as a Fianna Fáil candidate to the Dáil in the 2019 Cork North Central by-election, he was re-elected in the 2020. Sharon Keogan was elected to the Seanad in 2020 as an independent.

References

Post-2008 Irish economic downturn
2011 establishments in Ireland
Political parties established in 2011
Defunct political parties in the Republic of Ireland